Nowruz ( Nowrūz;  Nawrōz, or  Nəwai Kāl) is a cultural holiday in Afghanistan. It is also celebrated by many among the Afghan diaspora around the world. A day before Farmer's Day, the observance of Nowruz usually lasts two weeks, culminating on the first day of the Afghan New Year, March 21. 

Some Afghans, including members of the Taliban and their supporters, respectfully do not observe Nowruz traditions. During their rule in the late 1990s, Nowruz was banned "due to the thought that it was a pagan holiday centered on fire worship." After their reconquest of the country in 2021, the Islamic Emirate of Afghanistan officially cancelled the holiday, but claimed that they will not prevent people from celebrating it privately. 

Preparations for Nowruz start several days beforehand, at least after Chaharshanbe Suri, the last Wednesday before the New Year. Among various traditions and customs, the most important ones are as following (in alphabetical order):

 Buzkashi: Along with other customs and celebrations, normally a Buzkashi tournament is held during the Guli Surkh festival in Mazar-i-Sharif and other northern provinces, Kabul and other northern cities of Afghanistan.
 Guli Surkh festival: The Guli Surkh festival which literally means Red Flower Festival (referring to the red Tulip flowers) is the principal festival for Nowruz. It is celebrated in Mazar-i- Sharif during the first 40 days of the year when the Tulip flowers grow in the green plains and on the hills surrounding the city. People from all over the country travel to Mazar-i-Sharif to attend the Nowruz festivals. Various activities and customs are performed during the Guli Surkh festival, including the Jahenda Bala event and the Buzkashi games.
 Haft Mēwa: In Afghanistan, people prepare Haft Mēwa (literally translates as Seven Fruits) in addition to or instead of Haft Sin which is common in Iran. Haft Mewa is like a fruit salad made from seven different dried fruits, served in their own syrup. The seven dried fruits are: raisins, Senjed (the dried fruit of the oleaster tree), pistachios, hazelnuts, prunes (dried apricots), walnuts and either almonds or another species of plum fruit.
 Jahenda Bālā: Jahenda Bala is celebrated on the first day of the New Year (i.e. Nowruz), and is attended by high-ranking government officials such as the Vice-President, Ministers, and Provincial Governors. It is a specific religious ceremony performed in the Blue Mosque of Mazar that is believed (mostly by Shia Afghans) to be the site of the tomb of Ali ibn Abi Talib, the fourth caliph of Islam. The ceremony is performed by raising a special banner whose color configuration resembles Derafsh Kaviani. This is the biggest recorded Nowruz gathering where up to 200,000 people from all over Afghanistan get together in Mazar's central park around the Blue Mosque to celebrate the banner raising (Jahenda Bālā) ceremony.
 Jashn-e Dehqān: Jashn-e Dehqan means The Festival of Farmers. It is celebrated on the first day of year, on which the farmers walk in the cities as a sign of encouragement for the agricultural production. In recent years, this activity is being performed only in Kabul and other major cities, in which the mayor and other high governmental personalities participate in watching and observing.
 Kampirak: Like "Amu Nowruz" in Iran, he is an old bearded man wearing colorful clothes with a long hat and rosary who symbolizes beneficence and the power of nature yielding the forces of winter. He and his retinue pass village by village distributing gathered charities among people and do shows like reciting poems. The tradition is observed in central provinces specially Bamyan and Daykundi.
 Samanak: It is a special type of sweet dish made from germinated wheat, and is normally cooked or prepared on the eve of Nowruz or a few days before. Women have a special party for it during the night, and cook it from late in the evening till daylight, singing a special song: Samanak dar Josh o mā Kafcha zanem – Dochtaran* dar Khwāb o mā Dafcha zanem (* Dochter means daughter, young lady or girl).
 Sightseeing to Cercis fields: The citizens of Kabul go to Istalif, Charikar or other green places where the Cercis flowers grow. They go for a picnic with their family during the first two weeks of the new year.
 Special cuisine: People cook special types of dishes for Nowruz, especially on the eve of Nowruz. Normally they cook Sabzi Chalaw, a dish made from rice and spinach. Moreover, the bakeries prepare a special type of cookie, called Kulcha-e Nowruzī, which is only baked for Nowruz. Another dish which is prepared mostly for the Nowruz days is Māhī wa Jelabī (Fried Fish and Jelabi) and it is the most common meal in picnics. In Afghanistan, it is a common custom among the affianced families that the fiancé's family give presents to or prepare special dishes for the fiancée's family on special occasions such as the two Eids (Eid ul-Fitr and Eid al-Adha), Barā'at and Nowruz. Hence, the special dish for Nowruz is Māhī wa Jelabī.

See also
Culture of Afghanistan

References

External links

Public holidays in Afghanistan
Afghanistan
Festivals in Afghanistan